Peder Oluf Pedersen (19 June 1874 – 30 August 1941) was a Danish engineer and physicist. He is notable for his work on electrotechnology and his cooperation with Valdemar Poulsen on the developmental work on   Wire recorders, which he called a  telegraphone, and the arc converter known as the Poulsen Arc Transmitter.

Pedersen became a professor of telegraphy, telephony and radio in 1912.
He became principal of the College of Advanced Technology (Den Polytekniske Læreanstalt) in 1922, a title he held until his death. He was a Fellow of the American Institute of Electrical Engineers and was a member of the British Institution of Electrical Engineers. In 1915 he became a Fellow of the Institute of Radio Engineers.

See also
Tikker

References

External links
 Biography from PAST (Portal to Artifacts of Science and Technology)
 Photos from Polytech Photos
 Pedersen's gravestone

1874 births
1941 deaths
People from Varde Municipality
Danish engineers
Danish physicists
IEEE Medal of Honor recipients